The 1970 Long Beach State 49ers football team represented California State College, Long Beach—now known as California State University, Long Beach—as a member of the Pacific Coast Athletic Association (PCAA) during the 1970 NCAA College Division football season. Led second-year head coach Jim Stangeland, the 49ers compiled an overall record of 9–2–1 with a mark of 5–1 in conference play, sharing the PCAA title with San Diego State. Since Long Beach State had beaten San Diego State head-to-head, the 49ers qualified for a postseason bowl game, the Pasadena Bowl. Played on December 19 against the Missouri Valley Conference champion Louisville Cardinals at the Rose Bowl in Pasadena, the game ended in 24–24 tie. The team played four home games at Veterans Memorial Stadium adjacent to the campus of Long Beach City College in Long Beach, California and one well-attended game at Anaheim Stadium in Anaheim on a Friday night against San Diego State. 

Running back Leon Burns received first-team honors on the 1970 Little All-America college football team.

Schedule

 One game was played on Friday night (vs. San Diego State in Anaheim) and one was played on Thursday night (vs. Cal State Los Angeles in Monterey Park)

NFL Draft
Two 49ers were selected in the 1971 NFL Draft.

References

Long Beach State
Long Beach State 49ers football seasons
Big West Conference football champion seasons
Long Beach State 49ers football